Participação Especial is a compilation of duets by Cássia Eller with well-known artists of MPB and Brazilian pop. It was released after her death, in 2002.

Track listing

"Juventude Transviada" - with Luis Melodia.
"Milagreiro" - with Djavan.
"Relicario" - with Nando Reis.
"Mr. Scarecrow" - with Herbert Vianna.
"Um Tiro No Coração" - with Sandra de Sá.
"Malandragem" - with Barão Vermelho.
"De esquina" - with XIS and Nação Zumbi.
"A Rainha da Noite"/ "(I Can't Get No) Satisfaction" - with Edson Cordeiro.
"Luz Del Fuego" - with Rita Lee.
"Faça o Que Quiser Fazer" - Fábio Allman.
"Erva Daninha" - Guilherme de Brito.
"Você Passa, Eu Acho Graça" - with Noite Ilustrada.
"Não Deixe O Samba Morrer" - with Alcione.
"Quando A Maré Encher" - with Nação Zumbi.

References

2002 albums
Cássia Eller albums